Miraclathurella gracilis is an extinct species of sea snail, a marine gastropod mollusk in the family Pseudomelatomidae, the turrids and allies.

Description
The length of the shell attains 28.5 mm, its diameter 7.5 mm.

On the penult whorl there are sixteen axial ribs, crossed by five or six narrow spiral cords. On the body whorl there are about eighteen narrow, spiral cords, which are slightly enlarged where they cross the ribs and widely spaced in the peripheral region and above. Between them are many minute spirals and rather sharp axial striae.

Distribution
Fossils of this marine species were found in Tertiary strata of Santo Domingo.

References

 Gabb, William M. "Cretaceous and Tertiary fossils." (1869): 1–299.
 B. Landau and C. Marques da Silva. 2010. Early Pliocene gastropods of Cubagua, Venezuela: Taxonomy, palaeobiogeography and ecostratigraphy. Palaeontos 19:1-221

External links
 Fossilworks: Miraclathurella gracilis

gracilis
Gastropods described in 1866